Out of My Hands may refer to:

 Out of My Hands (Green River Ordinance album)
 Out of My Hands (Jennifer Rush album)
 Out of My Hands (Keisha White album)
 Out of My Hands (Morten Harket album)
 "Out of My Hands" (song), a 2010 song by Jars of Clay
 "Out of My Hands", a song by Dionne Warwick from the 1979 album Dionne
 "Out of My Hands", a song by The Buzzhorn from the 2002 album Disconnected
 "Out of My Hands", a song by The Donnas from the 2004 album Gold Medal
 "Out of My Hands", a song by Dave Matthews Band from the 2005 album Stand Up
 "Out of My Hands", a song by Milow
 Out of My Hand (film), a 2015 American film